Edward Bartlett Byfield (10 July 1928 – 23 December 2021) was a Canadian conservative journalist, publisher, and author. He founded the Alberta Report, BC Report and Western Report newsmagazines.

Early life and career
Byfield was born into a Unitarian family in Toronto, Ontario, in 1928 as the son of Caroline ( Gillett) and Vernon "Vern" Byfield, a reporter for the Toronto Telegram and Toronto Star. Byfield moved with his parents to Washington, D.C. at the age of 17.

He began his journalism career as a copy boy for the Washington Post. He returned to Canada in 1948 and worked at the Ottawa Journal and Timmins Daily Press and married Virginia Byfield. In 1952, the Byfields moved from Toronto with their two children under two, to Winnipeg where Ted Byfield began working at the Winnipeg Free Press. Covering Winnipeg city hall news, he once "crawled into an air conditioning duct in order to eavesdrop on a secret city council meeting enabling him to get a scoop on a funding scandal".

Religious conversion and advocacy

Company of the Cross
In 1952, Ted Byfield underwent a profound religious conversion. Inspired by the writings of Christian apologists, such as Dorothy L. Sayers, C.S. Lewis, and G. K. Chesterton, the couple committed to living their Christian faith fully. Through the St. John's Cathedral choir, Ted Byfield became part of a cell or group of seventeen men, which included Frank Wiens, that shared similar beliefs. They founded what they first called the Dynevor Society, and later the Company of the Cross, a lay Anglican order affiliated with the Anglican Church of Canada. The boy's choir at St. John's Cathedral became a club, then a weekend residential school starting in 1957, and finally, in 1962, a full-time "traditionalist"  Anglican private boarding school for boys. The Company of the Cross had acquired the abandoned Dynevor Indian Hospital in Selkirk, north of Winnipeg where they held their weekend schools. The cell officially changed their name from Dynevor to the Company of the Cross under the Manitoba Societies Act. In 1962, Byfield and five other members of the Company opened the first in a series of St. John's full-time boarding schools for boys "dedicated to the reassertion of Christian educational principles"—Saint John's Cathedral Boys' School. The school operated intentionally on "traditional" methods. They used mathematics textbooks from pre-World War II advancing from "arithmetic to calculus" with constant testing. Ginger Byfield taught French "developed from French-Canadian history." They watched hockey on the French channel. Byfield taught history which required that students read copiously from Thomas Costain to Francis Parkman. The 1974 National Film Board Film described the St. John's Cathedral Boys' School as the "most demanding outdoor school in North America." Upon arrival at the school, the new boys, 13- to 15-years old, undertook a 2-week canoe on the Red River and Lake Winnipeg.  In the spring there is a second longer canoe trip covering 900 miles with 55 portages. Parents pay $1700 dollars a year tuition.

In order to open their second school—Saint John's School of Alberta—the Byfields moved to Edmonton. The new school property, which was thirty kilometres west of Edmonton, at Stony Plain, Alberta had "110 hectares of bush, park and farmland". At first, their schools operated under the auspices of an Anglican bishop. The school practiced corporal punishment, and was eventually sued by an ex-student, Jeffrey Richard Birkin, who alleged that he was "forcefully exposed to experiences on the trip that put his life, health and safety at risk."

On November 7, 1973, with another school opening, the Byfields and school staff began publishing weekly editions of St. John's Edmonton Report. In March 18, 1977 they briefly began publishing St. John's Calgary Report. These two were later merged to become Alberta Report.

By 2003, the school had about 130 students and 30 staff members. It remained open until 2008. In the school's early years, Ted Byfield taught history and Virginia (Ginger) Byfield taught "French, English grammar and literature." Their third Company of the Cross school —Saint John's School of Ontario—was established at Claremont, Ontario in 1977 and closed in 1989. It was from this school that one of Canada's greatest boating tragedies occurred. Twelve boys and a staff member died of drowning and hypothermia on a canoe trip on 11 June 1978 on Lake Temiskaming.

In the early years, all employees of the Company of the Cross—which included teachers and staff at their school and writers at their magazines—earned a dollar per day, plus room and board. They lived in a three-story walk-up communal apartment block on 149 Street and 91st Avenue in Edmonton, called "Waverly Place," where they "attended morning and evening chapel services."

In an Alberta Report 21 October 1996 article, Byfield denounced "new-found" ideas on educating boys. By 1996, SJCS graduates were staff members at the St. John's School of Alberta near Warburg, Alberta where its program is evolved from the "Manitoba endeavour."

Conversion to Orthodox Church in America
Following the September 11 attacks, Ted and Virginia Byfield left the Anglican church, which had adopted a "modernistic theology" that the Byfield's considered to be "simply heretical." They converted to the Orthodox Church in America, a stricter form of Christianity. They were motivated to convert by the 11 September attacks, and a "sense of a growing conflict between Christianity and Islam." This concern also inspired them to work on a history of Christianity.

Alberta Report (1973–2003)

The couple began to publish St. John's Edmonton Report  in 1973, as a local newsletter, as an extension of the school they had opened in 1968 in Edmonton. This provided Byfield with the means to "combine his love of the news business with his desire to proselytize." He used the Report to "rail against homosexuals, abortionists, human rights commissions and public education." This was the precursor of the Alberta Report. In 1977, they launched the St. John's Calgary Report. In 1979 they merged the Edmonton and Calgary Reports into the Alberta Report.

The earlier model of The Company of the Cross, which included communal living and a meagre salary was not a successful business model. With the formation of the Alberta Report, Byfield shifted to a commercial enterprise model with staff receiving regular wages. It was during that time that Alberta and the federal government entered into their "energy wars." Byfield took on the role as the "guru of regional discontent" and his magazines fed a growing sentiment of Western Canadian discontent and alienation. He dared suggest "western separatism", emulating the province of Quebec's threats. By 1987, the Report's circulation in Alberta reached a record average of 53,277 a week. They attempted to establish a regional version but this failed. They established the B.C. Report in 1989, which launched an initial public offering on the Vancouver Stock Exchange in 1990. In addition to covering news from a conservative viewpoint, the Report magazines challenged the prevailing news and commentary about crime, homosexuality, abortion, and public education. In a 20 December 1993 article Byfield wrote that, "We do not think government is a good thing. We do not believe government on anything like the present scale is even a necessary thing. We believe government, or what it has turned into, to be an actively evil thing."

Byfield's son, Link Byfield succeeded him as editor and publisher. The Alberta Report 's circulation never again reached the peak it reached in the mid-1980s and continued to decline. Vincent Byfield, who had worked at the magazines from the start as a boy at age eight in 1973 and went on to manage B.C. Report in 1989, left in 1996. In 1997 all remaining subscribers were consolidated.

In 2003 "Alberta Report" ceased publication.

Selected books
Byfield has written a number of books including Just Think Mr. Berton in 1968, The Deplorable Unrest in the Colonies in 1983. In his 1998 The Book of Ted, Epistles from an Unrepentant Redneck, he published a collection of his "back-page" Alberta Report articles, where he championed "balanced budgets, back-to-basics education and tougher sentences for young criminal".

Alberta in the 20th Century, an illustrated history book
Starting in the early 1990s, Byfield published a series of eleven volumes on the history of Alberta, entitled Alberta in the 20th Century: A Journalistic History of the Province. The series which was published by Alberta Reports/ included contributions from Paul Bunner, Paul Stanway. In 2020, Chris P. Champion, social studies curriculum advisor to the Alberta Education Minister, Andriana LaGrange, strongly supported the inclusion of Byfield's history series as required reading for Grade 11 social studies, calling it a "comprehensive analytic narrative of the Province in the context of historians' debates and Canadian and world history". Champion said that these volumes would "increase students' knowledge of the past and provide counterbalance to the prevailing, politicizing social justice tendency that has already gone too far."

The Christian History Project and the Society to Explore and Record Christian History
In 1999, Byfield had plans to sell shares in Alberta Report  in the hope of raising $5 million on the public stock exchanges. At that time, he planned on starting an "edition of the magazine in Ontario" and a "40-volume book series on the history of Christianity."

Their first volume, The Veil Is Torn A.D. 30 to A.D. 70 Pentecost to the Destruction of Jerusalem, was published in 2003. By 2005, the Christian History Project had already invested $3.5-million and sales of the first volumes were slow. In order to raise funds to complete the series, Byfield created the Society to Explore and Record Christian History (SEARCH) as charities, with one in Alberta and the other in Virginia. They raised enough in donations to complete the series. Byfield served as president and chairman of SEARCH and his son, Vincent has been manager at SEARCH since 2011. Their illustrated twelve-volume series entitled  The Christians: Their First Two Thousand Years, initially published the first volume in 2001 ("The Veil is Torn / AD 30 to AD 70 / Pentecost to the Destruction of Jerusalem") in 2001 and the final 12th volume ("The High Tide and the Turn / AD 1914 to AD 2001 / A New Christendom Explodes into Life in the Third World") in 2013 through the Society to Explore and Record Christian History. 

In 2013, with The Christians completed, Byfield turned his focus to increasing the influence of SEARCH by introducing an online journal with current interest topics.

Political engagement
Byfield was one of the inspirations behind the founding of the Reform Party of Canada, was the keynote speaker at their inaugural meeting of the Reform Party in Winnipeg and coined the phrase "The West Wants In."

In a 1999 review of 'Byfield's 1998 publication, The Book of Ted, Epistles from an Unrepentant Redneck, said that the role of Ted Byfield—and by extension, the Alberta Review—in the creation of the Reform Party was similar to William F. Buckley and the National Review—"before there was Ronald Reagan there was Barry Goldwater, before there was Goldwater there was National Review, and before there was National Review  there was William F. Buckley."

Awards
1957 Canada's National Newspaper Award for Breaking News (formerly Spot News Reporting) 

On 19 October 2017, Betty Unger, Senator of Canada from Alberta, who was appointed in 2012 by then Prime Minister Stephen Harper, awarded Byfield, along with thirteen other Albertans, a Senate 150th Commemorative Medal for significant contributions to his community. Other recipients included Ralph Sorenson, who served in the Legislative Assembly of Alberta as a member of the Social Credit caucus in the official opposition from 1971 to 1975.

Personal life and death
Byfield and his wife Virginia (born 1929), who predeceased him in 2014, had six children, two of whom, Philippa and Link, predeceased their father. Ted Byfield died at his home on 23 December 2021, at the age of 93.

In popular culture
The fictional journalist, Dick Bennington in Frank Moher's 1988 play Prairie Report, is widely considered to be based on Ted Byfield.

Notes

References

1928 births
2021 deaths
Canadian magazine founders
Canadian magazine publishers (people)
Canadian male journalists
Canadian political commentators
Conservatism in Canada
Converts to Eastern Orthodoxy from Anglicanism
Critics of atheism
Eastern Orthodox Christians from Canada
Founders of educational institutions
Journalists from Toronto
Members of the Orthodox Church in America
Reform Party of Canada
Writers from Toronto